The 2023 Republican National Committee (RNC) Chairman election was held on January 27, 2023, in the United States, to determine the next chairman of the Republican National Committee.

The incumbent Chairwoman, Ronna McDaniel, was successfully reelected to an unprecedented fourth term in office. This was the first chairman election with multiple candidates since 2013.

Under RNC rules, three members from each state and U.S. territory, the state or territory’s party chair, one committeeman, and one committeewoman, cast ballots for chair, accounting for 168 votes, of which a majority is 85.

Campaign 
During the campaign, it was reported that McDaniel told RNC members that she would be best positioned to prevent Donald Trump from mounting a third party candidacy should he lose the 2024 Republican presidential primary. According to Politico, Dhillon's campaign privately reached out to 'pro-Trump' and 'anti-Trump' factions of the RNC for support.

Trump declined to endorse either McDaniel or Dhillon, and indicated he has a positive opinion of both contenders. Florida governor Ron DeSantis praised Dhillon's campaign, though Dhillon stated that his comments were "not an endorsement."

In January 2023, Dhillon reportedly faced a whisper campaign from McDaniel and supporters of Mike Lindell focusing on her Sikh faith. On January 11, 2023, McDaniel disavowed the attacks, citing her own minority Mormon faith.

Candidates

Nominated 

 Harmeet Dhillon, Civil Rights Attorney, RNC National Committeewoman for California (2016–Present), Chair of National Republican Lawyers Association, and former Vice Chair of the California Republican Party
 Mike Lindell, CEO of My Pillow, Inc., advisor to former President Donald Trump.
 Ronna McDaniel, Chair of the Republican National Committee (2017–Present)

Results 
On January 27, 2023, McDaniel was successfully re-elected RNC chair on the first ballot.

Notes

References 

Republican National Committee
2023 in American politics
Republican Party (United States) leadership elections
Republican National Committee
Republican National Committee chairmanship election